James Young Geddes (18501913) was a Scottish poet. Born in Dundee, he spent much of his youth and later life in Alyth, where he worked as a local correspondent for the Dundee Advertiser. He later served as chairman of Alyth Town Council. In the 1880s, he was president of Dundee Burns Club.

Collections 
 The New Jerusalem (1879)
 The Spectre Clock of Alyth (1886)
 To the Valhalla (1891)

References

1850 births
1913 deaths
19th-century Scottish writers
19th-century Scottish poets
Scottish literature